The Epidemic Prevention and Water Purification Department was a department of the Imperial Japanese Army from 1936 to the dissolution of the Army in 1945. While its public mission was to prevent the spread of disease and monitor water supply, several field armies also assigned units the mission of manufacturing biological weapons. Many units also performed unethical human experimentation, such as Unit 731, in which thousands of prisoners of war and civilians were tortured to death over the course of years.

Organization
The department was organized under the following system:
 Unit 691 was under control of the Kwantung Army.
  The central office of Unit 691 was Unit 731, infamous for its secret commitment to chemical and biological weapons and performing human experimentation. It had several branches, all of which were involved with biological warfare research:
 Unit 162 (Linkou)
 Unit 643 (Hailin)
 Unit 673 (Sunwu)
 Unit 319 was another sub-unit, which apparently were principally devoted to water purification.
 Unit 1855 (Beijing) was under control of the Japanese Northern China Area Army and performed human experimentation.
 Unit Ei 1644 or Tama Unit (Nanjing) was under control of the Japanese Central China Area Army and performed human experimentation.
 12 different sub-Units (Unknown names) (Unknown locations)
 Unit 8604 or Nami Unit (Guangzhou) was under control of the Japanese Southern China Area Army and performed human experimentation.
 Unit 9420 or Oka Unit (Singapore), under control of the Southern Expeditionary Army Group and probably performed human experimentation.
 Unit 100 was operated by the Kempeitai, the Japanese military police. It was located in Mokotan, Manchukuo, a village just south of the city of Changchun.
 Unit (Unknown name) (Dairen)
 Unit 543 (Hailar)
 Unit 516 (Qiqihar)
 Unit 525
 Unit 526
 Unit 160, possibly a typo (referring to unit 100).
The 1996 book Germ Warfare Units (細菌戦部隊) contains testimonies that all of these units engaged in biological weapon development.

Equipment
Each office was equipped with water purification facilities and trucks to transport water to where it was needed. The water filtration equipment was designed by Shirō Ishii of Unit 731.

References

Imperial Japanese Army
Japanese biological weapons program
1936 establishments in Japan